Sibel is a 2018 award-winning Turkish drama film starring Damla Sönmez and directed by Çagla Zencirci and Guillaume Giovanetti It was screened in the Contemporary World Cinema section at the 2018 Toronto International Film Festival.

Plot
25 years old Sibel lives with her father and sister in a remote village in the mountains of Turkey's Black Sea region. She is mute and communicates by using the ancient whistled language of their region.

Despised by her fellow villagers, she relentlessly hunts down a wolf sneaking in the neighboring forest, sparking off fears and fantasies among the villagers. There she crosses path with an injured and vulnerable fugitive, who is the first one to see her differently.

Cast
Damla Sönmez as Sibel
Emin Gürsoy as Emin
Erkan Kolçak Köstendil as Ali
Elit Iscan as Fatma
Meral Çetinkaya as Narin

Reception
On Metacritic, the film has a weighted average score of 65 out of 100 based on 4 reviews, indicating "generally favorable reviews".

Jay Weissberg of Variety magazine praised Sibels folklore and gender roles, while Jordan Mintzer of The Hollywood Reporter called it "a potent real-world feminist fable".

References

External links

2018 drama films
Turkish drama films
2010s Turkish-language films
French drama films
German drama films
Luxembourgian drama films
2010s French films
2010s German films